The Longden executive council was 10th executive council of British Ceylon. The government was led by Governor James Robert Longden.

Executive council members

See also
 Cabinet of Sri Lanka

References

1877 establishments in Ceylon
1883 disestablishments in Ceylon
Cabinets established in 1877
Cabinets disestablished in 1883
Ceylonese executive councils
Ministries of Queen Victoria